Colin McRae Rally 2.0 is a racing video game developed and published by Codemasters for PlayStation, Microsoft Windows and Game Boy Advance.

Description

Colin McRae Rally 2.0 features the works-entered cars and rallies of the 2000 World Rally Championship. The game has three difficulty levels, namely Novice, Intermediate and Expert. As with the previous game, Colin McRae Rally 2.0 lets players take part in rallying events set in various special stages across the world, and employs a number of cars featured in the 2000 World Rally Championship, such as the Ford Focus RS WRC and Subaru Impreza GC.

New features include Arcade mode, with direct head-to-head competition against AI drivers or another player, improved graphics with more detailed vehicle models and interiors, and a cleaner and more minimalist menu system, which would be retained for the rest of the series until the release of Dirt 2 in 2009. Nicky Grist, whom at the time was the co-driver for McRae in 2000, reprises his role from the first game, who would remain until the release of Colin McRae: Dirt in 2007; Grist later returned to voice as himself in Dirt 4 in 2017.

The race features a selection of cars featuring engines with a capacity in the region of 2.0, mostly which were in production at the time of the game's release - the Ford Focus, Ford Puma, Mitsubishi Lancer Evo VI, Peugeot 206, SEAT Cordoba, Subaru Impreza, and Toyota Corolla. A number of cars which had been in production a decade or more earlier are also featured - the Ford Sierra Cosworth and Peugeot 205 T16 from the 1980s, and the Ford Escort MK1, Mini Cooper S and Lancia Stratos from the late 1960s or early 1970s.

Reception

Colin McRae Rally 2.0 received "generally favorable" reviews, according to review aggregator Metacritic.

Doug Trueman reviewed the PlayStation version of the game for Next Generation, rating it four stars out of five, and stated that "a superb racer that has depth, a solid framerate, and high replay value. It doesn't get much better than this on PlayStation".

In their April 2001 issue, PC Gamer praised the game for its graphics, physics and damage modeling, as well as its many gameplay options. However, they criticized the short rally stages, the high difficulty, and most vehicles and tracks being locked until beating certain levels.

Colin McRae Rally 2.0 received a "Gold" sales award from the Entertainment and Leisure Software Publishers Association (ELSPA), indicating sales of at least 200,000 copies in the United Kingdom.

References

External links
 
 

2000 video games
Codemasters games
Colin McRae Rally and Dirt series
Game Boy Advance games
PlayStation (console) games
Racing simulators
Rally racing video games
Split-screen multiplayer games
Video games scored by Allister Brimble
Windows games
Video games set in Australia
Video games set in Finland
Video games set in Greece
Video games set in France
Video games set in Sweden
Video games set in Kenya
Sports video games set in Italy
Video games set in the United Kingdom
Video games developed in the United Kingdom